Caruso is an Italian surname derived from the Sicilian word for boy. In 19th century Sicily, the Carusi were young mine workers.

Notable people with the surname include:

Acting, directing, producing
 Anthony Caruso (actor) (1916–2003), American character actor 
 D.J. Caruso (born 1965), American film director
 David Caruso (born 1956), American actor and producer
 Eugenia Caruso (born 1984), English actress and screenwriter
 Fred C. Caruso, American film producer
 Marcos Caruso (born 1952), Brazilian actor and author of soap operas
 Pino Caruso (1934–2019), Italian actor, author and TV-personality
 Renai Caruso (born 1981), Serbian actress living in Australia
 Robert Caruso, director of commercials, video, and film
 Sophia Anne Caruso (born 2001), American actress

Business
 Anthony Caruso (entrepreneur), American business executive, president and CEO of CSA Group
 Dan Caruso (born 1963), American chairman and CEO of Zayo Group Holdings
 Gigi Caruso (born 2000), American businessperson and hearing loss advocate
 Henry Caruso (1922–2017), American businessman, founder of Dollar Rent A Car
 Rick Caruso (born 1959), American billionaire businessman in real estate
 Richard Caruso, American entrepreneur, founder and chairman of Integra Life Sciences

Crime
 Frank T. Caruso (1911–1983), Chicago mobster involved in illegal gambling and racketeering 
 Giuseppe Caruso (brigand) (1820–1892), Italian brigand
 Paul Caruso (1920–2001), American criminal defense attorney in Los Angeles, California
 Pietro Caruso (1899–1944), Italian fascist involved in the Fosse Ardeatine mass murder

Musical arts
 Enrico Caruso (1873–1921), Italian opera singer
 Justin Caruso, American DJ and record producer
 Luciano Caruso (composer) (born 1957), Italian jazz composer and soprano saxophonist
 Michael Caruso (musician) (born 1954), American singer-songwriter
 Paul Caruso (drummer) (1955–2006), drummer for the Boston band The Atlantics
 Pippo Caruso (1935–2018), Italian composer, conductor and music arranger
 Jim Caruso (born 1958), American singer, host, and producer

Sports

Basketball
 Alex Caruso (born 1994), American basketball player
 Henry Caruso (basketball) (born 1995), American-Italian basketball player

Cycling
 Damiano Caruso (born 1987), Italian road bicycle racer
 Giampaolo Caruso (born 1980), Italian road bicycle racer
 Roberto Caruso (born 1967), Italian road bicycle racer

Football (gridiron)
 Glenn Caruso (born 1974), American football coach and former player

Football (soccer)
 Francesco Caruso (born 1982), American soccer player
 Leandro Caruso (born 1982), Argentine footballer
 Ricardo Caruso Lombardi (born 1962), Argentine football manager
 Simone Caruso (born 1994), Italian football winger

Ice hockey
 Dave Caruso (born 1982), American ice hockey goaltender
 Michael Caruso (ice hockey) (born 1988), Canadian professional ice hockey defenceman

Other
 Emily Caruso (born 1977), American sport shooter
 Michael Caruso (racing driver) (born 1983), Australian racing driver
 Mike Caruso (baseball) (born 1977), American baseball shortstop
 Oliver Caruso (born 1974), German weightlifter
 Pat Caruso (born 1963), Italian field hockey player
 Salvatore Caruso (born 1992), Italian tennis player
 Stefano Caruso (born 1987), German-Italian ice dancer

Writing and journalism
 Dee Caruso (1928–2012) American writer for TV and film
 Denise Caruso (born 1956), American journalist and analyst 
 Domenico Caruso (born 1933), Italian poet and writer
 Luciano Caruso (born 1944), Italian poet, visual artist, critic, journalist and writer
 Michael Caruso (editor), former editor-in-chief of the Smithsonian magazine and coined the term "elevator pitch"

Other
 Anthony Caruso (disambiguation), several people
 Bruno Caruso (1927–2018), Italian artist, graphic designer and writer
 Dorothy Caruso (1893–1955), American socialite and the wife of Enrico Caruso
 Frank Caruso (chemical engineer) (born 1968), Australian professor and researcher
 Girolamo Caruso (1842–1923), Italian agronomist and university teacher
 Maria Caruso (born 1980), Pittsburgh native dancer and choreographer
 Michelle Caruso-Cabrera (born 1967), American business news reporter
 Mike Caruso (politician) (born 1958), American politician of the Republican Party

See also 
 Charles Anthony (tenor) (1929–2012), American actor and tenor, born Calogero Antonio Caruso
 Gershon Sirota (1874–1943), called the "Jewish Caruso", leading cantor of Europe, died in the Warsaw Ghetto
 Carusi (disambiguation)
 Crusoe (disambiguation)

Italian-language surnames